Piura is a province in the Piura Region in northwestern Peru. Its capital, the city of Piura, is also the regional capital. The province is the most populous in the region as well as its center of economic activity.

Boundaries 

Northeast Sullana Province
Northwest Ayabaca Province
East Morropón Province
Southeast Lambayeque Region
Southwest Sechura Province
West Paita Province

Political division 

The Piura Province is divided into ten districts, each of which is headed by a mayor (alcalde). The districts, with their capitals in parenthesis, are:

 Piura (Piura), in Piura metropolitan area 
 Castilla (Castilla), in Piura metropolitan area 
 Veintiséis de Octubre (San Martín), in Piura metropolitan area  
 Catacaos (Catacaos), in Piura metropolitan area 
 Cura Mori (Cucungará)
 El Tallán (Sinchao)
 La Arena (La Arena)
 La Unión (La Unión)
 Las Lomas (Las Lomas)
 Tambo Grande (Tambo Grande)

External links 

  Municipalidad Provincial de Piura - Piura provincial municipality
  Documental Piura: Provincia de Piura

1861 establishments in Peru
Provinces of the Piura Region